A Game with Stones is a 1965 short animated film by Czech animator Jan Švankmajer. It utilizes stop-motion animation.

Themes 
The animator uses a motif of clocks and stones, accompanied by bizarre sounds and a xylophone/music box score. The film makes use of texture and pattern, with an emphasis on the dichotomy of black and white. The use of old and antique objects reappears in many of the filmmaker's later works.

Production
The film was Švankmajer's first collaboration with Austrian producer Alexander Hans Puluj and cinematographer Peter Puluj, who were both born in Prague. They were sons of a famous physicist Ivan Puluj. The whole film was shot in an Austrian farmhouse.

References

External links

1965 films
1965 animated films
1960s stop-motion animated films
1960s animated short films
Austrian animated short films
Films directed by Jan Švankmajer
Surrealist films